Victor "Vic" Allen Renalson, MBE (1926/1927 – July 1998) was an Australian athlete, weightlifter, and track and field coach. He won ten medals at four Paralympics from 1964 to 1976, and worked as a track and field coach for both Olympic and Paralympic athletes.

Personal life
Renalson became a paraplegic after a car accident in 1951 at the age of 23. He was working as a fitter and Turner and was driving to North Queensland to work on a sugarcane plantation when the steering on his car failed near Sarina. The car hit a bridge and he was thrown  to a dry creek bed. He was married to Laurel, a former Queensland netballer and Australian walking champion, who died in 1992. He died in July 1998 on Queensland's Sunshine Coast at the age of 71.

Career
Renalson won medals in weightlifting at all four Paralympics from 1964 to 1976: a silver medal in the Men's Heavyweight event at the 1964 Tokyo Games, a gold medal in the Men's Heavyweight event at both the 1968 Tel Aviv and 1972 Heidelberg Games, and a gold medal in the Men's Middleweight event at the 1976 Toronto Games. He participated in athletics at three Paralympics from 1968 to 1976; in 1968 he won two gold medals in the Men's Club Throw A and Men's Discus A events, a silver medal in the Men's Javelin A event, and a bronze medal in the Men's Shot Put A event, and in 1972 he won a silver medal in the Men's Discus 3 event and a bronze medal in the Men's Precision Javelin open event.

A lifelong member of the Toowong Harriers Club, he coached Olympians Norma Croker, Eric Bigby, and Pat Duggan. Bigby said of him:

He was Australia's head track and field coach at the 1988 Seoul Paralympics, and worked with the Australian Institute of Sport as a satellite track and field coach from 1987 to 1993.

Recognition
Renalson was a finalist in the ABC Sportsman of the Year award in 1968, and became a member of the Order of the British Empire in 1973 for services to sport and the community.

References

1920s births
1998 deaths
Paralympic athletes of Australia
Paralympic weightlifters of Australia
Weightlifters at the 1964 Summer Paralympics
Athletes (track and field) at the 1968 Summer Paralympics
Weightlifters at the 1968 Summer Paralympics
Athletes (track and field) at the 1972 Summer Paralympics
Weightlifters at the 1972 Summer Paralympics
Athletes (track and field) at the 1976 Summer Paralympics
Weightlifters at the 1976 Summer Paralympics
Medalists at the 1964 Summer Paralympics
Medalists at the 1968 Summer Paralympics
Medalists at the 1972 Summer Paralympics
Medalists at the 1976 Summer Paralympics
Wheelchair category Paralympic competitors
Paralympic gold medalists for Australia
Paralympic silver medalists for Australia
Paralympic bronze medalists for Australia
Paralympic medalists in athletics (track and field)
Paralympic medalists in weightlifting
Members of the Order of the British Empire
Australian athletics coaches
People with paraplegia
Sportsmen from Queensland
Club throwers
Australian male discus throwers
Australian male javelin throwers
Australian male shot putters
Wheelchair discus throwers
Wheelchair javelin throwers
Wheelchair shot putters
Paralympic discus throwers
Paralympic javelin throwers
Paralympic shot putters
Paralympic club throwers